Igor Nedeljković (born 24 September 1991) is a Serbian professional footballer who plays as a striker for Ħamrun Spartans.

Early life
Nedeljković was born in Belgrade, Serbia. As a young player, he started to play for his local team FK Zeleznik.As a professional soccer player he is closely related to the other sports such as Tennis and Basketball. His favourite tennis player is Novak Djokovic

Club career

FK Čukarički
In 2009, Nedeljković began his professional career with FK Čukarički who made 31 appearances and scored two goals.

FK Sutjeska Nikšić
In 2013, Igor Nedeljković signed for FK Sutjeska Nikšić on a one-year deal.

FK Sileks
In 2014, Nedeljković joined FK Sileks on a three-year deal contract. There, he scored 27 goals in 93 appearances becoming one of the main strikers of the team.

Hong Kong Pegasus
On 27 July 2017, Nedeljković joined Hong Kong Premier League side Hong Kong Pegasus. On 26 August 2017, he making his debut in a 1–0 away win against Southern District after being named in the starting line-up and scoring his side's only goal from penalty kick.

Flamurtari Vlorë
On 7 December 2017, Nedeljković signed Albanian Superliga side Flamurtari Vlorë. On 26 January 2018, he made his debut in a 1–0 home win against Partizani Tirana after coming on as a substitute at 46th minute in place of Victor Juffo.Nedeljkovic scored two goals against Lushnja in the cup match and in an away game against Luftetari. After some economical problems regarding club finances, he broke the contract.

FK Rabotnički
After a short experience with Flamurtari FC, Nedeljkovic joined FK Rabotnički and made 11 appearances.

Ghajnsilem F.C
Nedeljković joined Għajnsielem F.C. in summer 2019. Since the first season, Nedeljković managed to score 20 goals in 13 appearances and won the Player of the month award in December. The second season started in the best way possible by scoring 12 goals in 7 appearances, 2 of them in league cup matches.

Hamrun Spartans FC
On 1st of July 2022 ,Nedeljkovic joined Hamrun Spartans FC. He signed a 1-year contract and was given the number 35 shirt. He made his debut for the club on 7th of July against FC Alashkert in Europa Conference League.

References

External links

Profile at Hong Kong Football Association
 

1991 births
Living people
Serbian footballers
Association football forwards
FK Čukarički players
FK Sutjeska Nikšić players
FK Sileks players
TSW Pegasus FC players
Flamurtari Vlorë players
FK Rabotnički players
Għajnsielem F.C. players
Serbian SuperLiga players
Serbian First League players
Montenegrin First League players
Hong Kong Premier League players
Kategoria Superiore players
Macedonian First Football League players
Serbian expatriate footballers
Serbian expatriate sportspeople in Montenegro
Serbian expatriate sportspeople in North Macedonia
Serbian expatriate sportspeople in Hong Kong
Serbian expatriate sportspeople in Albania
Expatriate footballers in Montenegro
Expatriate footballers in North Macedonia
Expatriate footballers in Hong Kong
Expatriate footballers in Albania